Serbia is scheduled to compete at the 2019 European Games, in Minsk, Belarus from 21 to 30 June 2019.

The Olympic Committee of Serbia sent a total of 66 athletes to the Games, 40 men and 25 women, to compete in 12 sports.

Medalists

| width="78%" align="left" valign="top" |

Archery

Compound

Badminton

Men

Basketball (3x3)

Men's tournament

Pool A

Quarterfinals

Women's tournament

Pool A

Boxing

Men

Women

Canoeing

Men

Women

Cycling

Road

Men
 

Women

Judo

Men

Women

Mixed team

Karate

Men

Women

Sambo

Men

Women

Shooting

Men

Women

Mixed

Table tennis

Wrestling

Men's Freestyle

Men's Greco-Roman

References

Nations at the 2019 European Games
European Games
2019